Jane Corner Young (March 25, 1915 – March 9, 2001) was an American composer, music therapist, and pianist. She was born in Athens, Ohio, and graduated with a Bachelor of Music degree from Ohio University in 1936. She completed a master of music degree in piano and composition in 1953 at the Cleveland Institute of Music. Young studied piano with Beryl Rubinstein and Arthur Loesser; composition with Marcel Dick; and Dalcroze eurythmics with Elsa Findlay and Ann Lombardo.

Young taught privately and in public schools for over 27 years, and was a faculty member at the Cleveland Institute of Music. She chaired the Cleveland Composers' Guild when it was formed in 1957, and also served as the director of music therapy at Hawthornden State Hospital (today known as Northcoast Behavioral Healthcare) in Northfield, Ohio.

Young's awards include:

Ohio University Music Fellowship (1942)
Cleveland Institute Alumni Award (in composition; 1961) 
Mu Phi Epsilon (winner, composition contest; 1971)

Young's compositions include:

Chamber 

Essences (for two violins; won 1961 Cleveland Institute Alumni Award)

Piano 

Andante Espressivo
Caprice (1976)
Children's Picture Pieces
Dramatic Soliloquy (1961)
First Journey
Five Duets for Matched Students
Five Tone Thoughts and Summary (won 1971 Mu Phi Epsilon Composition Contest)
Four Recital Pieces (The Chase; Patterns; Shadows; Waltz)
I Won't Go
Piano Gambol
Schumanniana (1974)
Two Humorous PIeces (Going Away; March for Clowns)
Two Short Studies (Counting; Two Melodies)
Two Study Pieces (Half Steps; Whole Steps)
Variations on an American Sea Shanty
Yesterday/Today

Vocal 

Blues Art Song: Who There to Know
Captive (with L. Kenney)
Fantasy (with L. Kenney)
How I Like a Wild Tame Bird (with piano)
(The) Story of Fay (with bassoon, flute, oboe, piano, trumpet, violin and zither)
Such is Her Love (with piano)
Untidy Sun (with L. Kenney)
We People Song Cycle (with cello and piano)

References 

American women classical composers
American classical composers
American composers
1915 births
2001 deaths
20th-century American women
20th-century American people
Ohio University alumni